The Feminist Library was founded as the Women's Research and Resources Centre in 1975 by a group of women concerned about the future of the Fawcett Library to ensure that the history of the women's liberation movement survived. The founders included feminist academics like Diana Leonard and Leonore Davidoff.

History
The library started out as a small collection of contemporary material, but is now considered to be the most significant library of feminist material in England, containing some 7500 books, of which around 5000 are non-fiction, 500 poetry publications, and 1500 periodical titles, many self-published, spanning over about 85 metres of shelving. There is also a large number of pamphlets, currently held at the Bishopsgate Institute.

2003 crisis
The library faced a financial crisis in 2003 when Lambeth Council dramatically increased the rent on the building housing the collections.

Four years later, in 2007, the management committee called an emergency meeting as a final attempt to gather support. Fortunately, the meeting was well attended and the library was saved, although it still struggles today, depending on grants to survive.

Librarians for Tomorrow
In January 2010, the library announced that it had received a grant from Awards for All, which it intended to use to train volunteers in radical librarianship, using the library itself as a resource. In March 2010, fifteen volunteers were chosen from many applicants and they began working at the library in April 2010. One of the trainees began writing an anonymous blog about her experiences.

Further updates
Opening hours had increased from 2013 to 2014 but remained dependent on the availability of volunteers. In 2015 the Library celebrated its 40th anniversary, while by 2018 it was open afternoons or evenings from Tuesday to Saturday.

High ratio of fiction to non-fiction
The amount of poetry and fiction in the library is unusual for a special collection focused on a political movement. The reason for this is that the library wanted to ensure individual women were represented as part of their liberation, as explained by Gail Chester, a member of the library's management committee, in an interview with Anne Welsh in 2007.

See also
Women's Library
Leonore Davidoff
East End Women's Museum

References

External links
Feminist Library website
Feminist Library catalogue
Adventures of a Radical Feminist Librarian , written by one of the library's volunteers.
Feminist Libraries & Archives Network

Feminism in England
Women's studies
Libraries in the London Borough of Lambeth
1975 establishments in England
1975 in London
Libraries established in 1975
Women in London